For the Rowing competition at the 1982 Asian Games in India, men's singles, doubles, and fours competed. The competition was held at the Jamwa Ramgarh Lake near Jaipur.

Medalists

Medal table

References

External links 
 Olympic Council of Asia

 
1982 Asian Games events
1982
Asian Games